Genevieve Gaignard, born in Orange, Massachusetts in 1981, is best known for work exploring issues of race, class, and gender. As a self-identified mixed-race woman, Gaignard utilizes photography, videography, and installation to explore the overlap of black and white America through staged environments and character performances. She received an AAS in Baking & Pastry Arts from Johnson & Wales University, her BA in photography from the Massachusetts College of Art and Design in 2007, and an MFA from Yale University in 2014. Gaignard's work is represented by Susanne Vielmetter Los Angeles Projects, and has been shown at Shulamit Nazarian, The Cabin, The FLAG Art Foundation, The California African American Museum, The Foley Gallery, and at two residentially-owned art spaces in Los Angeles, CA. She was also included in the fourth iteration of the triennial Prospect New Orleans, in 2018, with an installation at the Ace Hotel New Orleans. Her work has been featured in The New York Times and The Los Angeles Times. Gaignard's photographic series draw inspiration from Carrie Mae Weems, Diane Arbus, Cindy Sherman, and Nikki S. Lee, remixed with the references to the selfie and Instagram culture.

Early life 
Born and raised in a Massachusetts mill town by a white mother and black father, Gaignard grew up between black and white cultures. Before enrolling at the Massachusetts College of Art and Design, Gaignard first enrolled at Johnson & Wales University in Providence, Rhode Island, in their baking and pastry program. She became interested in pursuing the arts after one of her professors became her mentor. Her professor created alternative assignments for Gaignard, reintroduced her to mediums such as collage, and opened Gaignard to experimentation in installation. According to Gaignard, she “went through this phase where Abercrombie & Fitch was really cool, I would rip pages out of the catalog and collage my whole wall with half naked guys.” Gaignard began investigating racial dynamics with the use of composed environments and fabricated characters.

Gaignard began photographing her family and neighbors as she transitioned into the Massachusetts College of Art and Design. For a week of assignments “dealing with flesh,” Gaignard used her mother as a subject.

Following her graduation in 2007, she applied to Yale University where she was wait-listed. Her anxiety surrounding her admission status motivated her to experiment with video art, where she created offbeat films. After she was eventually accepted, Gaignard transitioned back to photographic mediums with the added juxtaposition of installation. Yale's predominantly white student body contrasted sharply with the culturally diverse city of New Haven, prompting Gaignard to think through how to balance her two ethnicities. During her time at Yale, she began incorporating the intensity of race and storytelling in her work: “My expression as a person of color is different than others. I have something to say...The stuff I say now sort of addresses a lot of feelings I had as a child.” It was through her exploration of race and family relations that she began creating personas staged in elaborate domestic interiors.

Work 
As an emerging artist, Gaignard first garnered wider attention with her 2016 exhibition Smell the Roses at the California African American Museum in Los Angeles. The exhibition included a number of photographs of Gaignard dressed as a variety of characters alongside two elaborate room-sized installations, one of them a bedroom with a daybed covered in Cabbage Patch Kids dolls. Of the nine photographs featured in the exhibition, "Extra Value (After Venus)", shows Gaignard against a painted American flag holding a McDonald's cup and fries; another depicts Gaignard as a small-town housewife holding a watermelon in front of a discount store.

Gaignard explores racial “passing” and gender to address the difficulties of being a mixed race woman in American society. While Gaignard's work is said to be similar to Cindy Sherman and Carrie Mae Weems, she prefers not to be compared to them. Like Weems, Gaignard's works focuses on black female bodies and their place within society. Gaignard's digital photographs utilize pop culture references and selfie culture to examine mixed race identity and black womanhood. She consistently questions mass media and how it presents white and black cultures by pushing contrasts in her fictitious, femme characters.

Gaignard blends her digital photography with installations evoking the ideal family home. She states, “When I make an installation, I want it to be somewhere between a Wes Anderson film and Harmony Korine’s Gummo: gross and perfect at the same time but those are also super white references—so, that’s always my challenge.”

Gaignard exaggerates elements of her personas, posing racial anxieties for viewers through parallel perspectives of her own self-identity. Although racial contrast is important to her characters and her overall work, Gaignard also blurs the lines between representations of black and white women by drawing on current and past pop culture references. By blending representations, stereotypes, and taking inspiration from drag culture, she further challenges beauty standard norms, while also showing others the “invisibility” she faced growing up.

Gaignard's work is in a number of public collections, including the Allen Memorial Art Museum, Nasher Museum of Art, California African American Museum, Pérez Art Museum Miami, Studio Museum in Harlem, and San Jose Museum of Art.

Exhibitions

Bibliography

External links 

 

1981 births
People from Orange, Massachusetts
Artists from Los Angeles
American women artists
Living people
Yale School of Art alumni
Massachusetts College of Art and Design alumni
21st-century American women